This is a list of Southern Cross University people, including alumni and staff.

Notable alumni
Darren Albert, former professional rugby league footballer 
Lina Eve, artist, adoption activist, singer/songwriter, photographer and filmmaker
Deej Fabyc, performance artist
Paul Glynn, Jesuit author
Ryan Gobbe, musician
Ashok Lavasa, IAS Former Election commissioner of India
Justin Harrison, former rugby union player
David Heilpern, magistrate
Debra Jackson,  nurse, academic and author
Jodi Martin, singer-songwriter
Ben Newton, paralympic gold medalist
Andrew Nikolic, Liberal politician 
James Page, educationist
Kim Planert, German film and television composer
Steve Price, former professional rugby league footballer
Poto Williams, Member of the New Zealand Parliament

Notable faculty members
Michael Hannan, composer and musicologist, founder of the University's Bachelor in Contemporary Music program.

Administration

Chancellors

Vice-Chancellors

References

Southern Cross University
Southern Cross University people